Veselin Ljubenov Tsvetkovski (born 8 March 1989) is a Bulgarian footballer who plays as a goalkeeper for Lokomotiv Mezdra.

Career
He made his competitive first-team debut on 8 October 2009 in a 3–1 win at away to Lokomotiv Septemvri in a match of the Bulgarian Cup. During 2010–11 season, Tsvetkovski earned 22 appearances in the Bulgarian B PFG.

Career statistics
As of 1 August 2014

References

External links

1989 births
Living people
Bulgarian footballers
FC Botev Vratsa players
FC Montana players
PFC Marek Dupnitsa players
First Professional Football League (Bulgaria) players
Association football goalkeepers